Herpsilochmus is a genus of insectivorous passerine birds in the antbird family (Thamnophilidae). They are found in forest, woodland and shrub in South America, although a single species the rufous-winged antwren (H. rufimarginatus) also occurs in Panama. All are relatively small antbirds that are sexually dichromatic. In most (but not all) species males are essentially light grey with a black crown and black-and-white wings, while females are more buff or rufous with black-and-white crown.

The genus Herpsilochmus was introduced by the German ornithologist Jean Cabanis in 1847. The name of genus combines the Ancient Greek words herpō "to creep about" and lokhmē "thicket" or "copse". The type species is the Bahia antwren.

The genus contains 17 species:
 Ash-throated antwren, Herpsilochmus parkeri
 Creamy-bellied antwren, Herpsilochmus motacilloides
 Predicted antwren, Herpsilochmus praedictus
 Aripuana antwren, Herpsilochmus stotzi
 Black-capped antwren, Herpsilochmus atricapillus
 Bahia antwren or pileated antwren, Herpsilochmus pileatus
 Spot-tailed antwren, Herpsilochmus sticturus
 Dugand's antwren, Herpsilochmus dugandi
 Todd's antwren, Herpsilochmus stictocephalus
 Ancient antwren, Herpsilochmus gentryi
 Spot-backed antwren, Herpsilochmus dorsimaculatus
 Roraiman antwren, Herpsilochmus roraimae
 Pectoral antwren, Herpsilochmus pectoralis
 Large-billed antwren, Herpsilochmus longirostris
 Yellow-breasted antwren, Herpsilochmus axillaris
 Rusty-winged antwren, Herpsilochmus frater
 Rufous-margined antwren, Herpsilochmus rufimarginatus

References

 
Bird genera
Taxonomy articles created by Polbot